Ryszard Janusz Bender (16 February 1932 – 24 February 2016) was a Polish right-wing politician and historian. He is noted for his characterization of Auschwitz as a "labour camp", attracting allegations of Holocaust denial.

Career
He was professor of History at John Paul II Catholic University of Lublin. From 1976 to 1980 and from 1985 to 1989, he was a deputy of the Sejm. He continued to be a senator in post-Communist Poland from 1991 to 1993 and from 2005 to 2007. He was one of the co-founders of League of Polish Families, a far-rght party. In 2007, he won election to the Senate from the Law and Justice Party, becoming the oldest member.

Characterization of Auschwitz and Holocaust denial 
In January 2000, Bender took part in a show on Radio Maryja — an antisemitic radio station — to defend Dariusz Ratajczak, a Polish historian, who was convicted of the denial of Holocaust for arguing that the Auschwitz Gas Chambers were meant to disinfect the Jews than to kill them among other things. Speaking on the occassion, Bender characterized Auschwitz as "not a death camp [but] a labour camp" where the "labour was not always hard"; he claimed that the Jews were not only well-fed but also occupied significant positions in the camp administration. He concluded that the "Jewish lobby" was persecuting Ratajczak.

The remarks attracted immediate ire from various quarters including Catholic Bishops who demanded an unconditional apology, his university which initiated disciplinary proceedings, and survivors of concentration camps; in what was a "national scandal", he was accused of engaging in antisemitism and Holocaust denial. Legal proceedings were initiated at a court in Torun but the case was dismissed. In response, Bender complained about the legal provisions on Holocaust denial being weaponized by fundamentalist Jews to appropriate the Auschwitz only for their own; he also cited the sacrosanctity of academic freedom. A decade later, Bender claimed that his remarks were taken out of context.

Brian Porter-Szucs, a historian of Polish nationalism at University of Michigan, notes that Bender advocated an ahistorical about view about how the Nazis did not intend to particularly target the Jews but rather assault Poland and God.

Jedwabne Pogrom 
While campaigning for the 2001 elections, Bender denied Polish culpability in the Jedwabne pogrom.

Personal Life 
Bender has a daughter - Bogna Bender, a journalist for TVP Lublin.

References

External links
 Official website of Ryszard Bender

1932 births
2016 deaths
People from Łomża
People from Białystok Voivodeship (1919–1939)
Znak (association) members
Law and Justice politicians
Movement for Reconstruction of Poland politicians
Members of the Polish Sejm 1976–1980
Members of the Polish Sejm 1985–1989
Members of the Senate of Poland 1991–1993
Members of the Senate of Poland 2005–2007
20th-century Polish historians
Polish male non-fiction writers
Holocaust denial
John Paul II Catholic University of Lublin alumni
Academic staff of the John Paul II Catholic University of Lublin
Fulbright alumni